Marie Elizabeth Amy Castilla (26 September 1868 – 9 November 1898), known as Amy Castilla, was an Australian medical doctor and journalist. With a group of other women doctors, she was one of the founding members of the Queen Victoria Hospital, Melbourne. She was inducted into the Victorian Honour Roll of Women in 2007.

She studied medicine at the University of Melbourne, receiving an MBBS in 1893. She was the first woman to be appointed house surgeon in a general hospital when she took up that role at St Vincent's Hospital in 1894. She died of tuberculosis, and was cared for in her illness by her friend and fellow doctor Helen Sexton. Her sister, Ethel Castilla, was a poet and correspondent for The Sydney Mail, the Daily Telegraph, and The Herald and Weekly Times.

References

1868 births
1898 deaths
Medical doctors from Melbourne
Melbourne Medical School alumni
University of Melbourne women
Australian women medical doctors